Caleb Chapman (born August 15, 1973) is an American music educator, author, entrepreneur, producer, bandleader, and musician from Derry, New Hampshire, who currently resides in Utah. A graduate of Brigham Young University, he is the founder and Chairman of Caleb Chapman's Soundhouse, a professional musician training program with locations across the U.S. and the director of Caleb Chapman's Crescent Super Band. Chapman has been recognized for his contributions to music education and has received numerous honors for his work as an educator.

Educator/Director
Chapman oversees the 20+ bands at the Salt Lake City, UT, performance studio of Caleb Chapman's Soundhouse, and personally directs the flagship group Caleb Chapman's Crescent Super Band, an award-winning ensemble that consists of high school students. Additional groups that Chapman personally directs include: the Voodoo Orchestra, Caleb Chapman's Little Big Band, Time Check Jazz Orchestra and La Onda Caribeña. His bands have been featured on the Sirius XM “Real Jazz” Channel and released 10 full-length albums on the Big Swing Face record label. The Crescent Super Band remains the only musical act that is regularly invited to play during the halftime break for the NBA’s Utah Jazz basketball team. The Utah-based Caleb Chapman's Soundhouse trains students of all ages and levels, providing performance opportunities and exposure to high-caliber musicians. Graduates of the program have been placed in music schools around the country including Juilliard, the University of Miami, the Berklee College of Music, University of Southern California and the Manhattan School of Music.

Saxophonist 
As a saxophonist, Chapman performs frequently. In 2016, he was part of the touring band of Neon Trees on their US tour. He also co-founded the Osmond Chapman Orchestra with David Osmond, part of the musical Osmond family and nephew of Donny Osmond. He has performed the National Anthem on solo saxophone at NBA games for the Boston Celtics, the Miami Heat, the Denver Nuggets, the Washington Wizards, and the Utah Jazz. He is also on recordings by numerous artists, including the GRAMMY-winning DJ, Kaskade.

Key Performances 
Chapman's bands have been featured at many jazz festivals including North Sea (The Netherlands), Montreux (Switzerland), Vienne (France), Umbria (Italy), Tuscany (Italy), Birmingham (UK), and Puerto Vallarta (Mexico). In 2010, the Crescent Super Band was featured with National Endowment for the Arts Jazz Master Toshiko Akiyoshi at the Telluride Jazz Festival. Their most prominent performance took place at Carnegie Hall in May 2013, when the Crescent Super Band headlined a concert featuring saxophonist David Sanborn and trumpeter Wayne Bergeron. The Crescent Super Band performed at the 2014 Jazz Education Network annual conference in Dallas, TX, headlining an evening concert with special guests Randy Brecker and Ed Calle.

Collaborations
Chapman's bands have performed with more than 200 guest artists, including GRAMMY award winners David Paich of Toto, Jeff Coffin of Dave Matthews Band, Randy Brecker of Blood, Sweat, and Tears, Branford Marsalis, Victor Wooten, Joe Lovano, Christian McBride, Peter Erskine, Kirk Whalum, Kurt Elling, Gordon Goodwin, Poncho Sanchez, Esperanza Spalding, Brian Lynch, Wayne Bergeron, Dave Weckl, Nicholas Payton, Eric Marienthal, Ernie Watts, and Bob Mintzer. They have also performed and/or recorded with members of such well-known groups as the Dave Matthews Band, Maroon 5, Neon Trees, Big Bad Voodoo Daddy, Tower of Power, Genesis, the Saturday Night Live Band, and many others. Chapman has said that it is a priority for Caleb Chapman's Soundhouse to provide the opportunity for young musicians to perform with A-list artists, and have frequent touring and performing experiences.

Awards and honors
In 2013, Chapman was a quarter-finalist for the inaugural Music Educator Award, presented by The Recording Academy and the GRAMMY Foundation. In 2014, he was again recognized as a quarter-finalist for the award. In 2015, he was a national semi-finalist for the award.

Since 2005, Caleb’s program has been honored with 52 different awards by DownBeat Magazine. As the oldest publication in the jazz industry, DownBeat celebrates high-caliber jazz education with its annual awards. The Crescent Super Band, the Voodoo Orchestra, the Soul Research Foundation, Caleb Chapman’s Little Big Band, the Hooligans Brass Band, Lo-Fi Riot, and La Onda Caribena have all been recognized with at least one award from the magazine.

Utah Governor Gary Herbert honored Chapman with the 2013 "Utah Performing Artist Award" in a special dinner reception at the Governor's Mansion, where the Crescent Super Band also performed, to commemorate the evening. In 2014, Utah Governor Herbert appointed Chapman to the Utah Arts Council Board of Directors, as the board representative for the music discipline. In 2012, 2014, 2016, 2017, he was selected as Best Educator in the Music Education category and in 2016, the Best Educator in all categories, in the Utah Best of State awards.

In 2015, he was inducted in to the Pinkerton Academy Hall of Fame in New Hampshire.

In 2011, Caleb was named the "John LaPorta International Jazz Educator of the Year".

Leadership

Jazz Education Network
In 2016, Chapman was elected President of the Jazz Education Network, a 501(c)(3) nonprofit that serves the jazz arts community by advancing education, promoting performance, and developing new audiences. He also designed and launched the organization's JENerations Jazz Festival in 2014. The festival is held concurrently with JEN's annual conference, and features student groups who perform for celebrity clinicians in a non-competitive adjudicated festival environment.

Jazz Band of America
In 2013, Chapman was appointed Director of the prestigious Jazz Band of America, an all-star jazz band consisting of the top high school jazz students from across the nation. The group performed at the Music for All National Festival in Indianapolis in March, 2014. Chapman joins a list of past directors and guest artists with the ensemble that include Wynton Marsalis, Patti Austin, Wayne Bergeron, Wycliffe Gordon, Dr. Lou Fischer, and Ndugu Chancler, among others.

Additional Leadership Activities
Chapman currently serves on the Executive Board of JazzSLC, presenters of the Salt Lake City Jazz at the Capitol Theatre Series. Additionally, Chapman serves as Festival Director for the Peaks Jazz Festival and the Artist Director for the Puerto Vallarta Jazz Festival. He was a past-president of the Utah Unit of the International Association for Jazz Education (IAJE) and a member of the organization's Resource Team.

Publications

Books
In 2013, Caleb released his first music method book with Alfred Music, titled The Articulate Jazz Musician. The book focuses on Chapman's celebrated method for teaching jazz articulation and style to young musicians. It features 14 original tunes from multi-GRAMMY-winning member of the Dave Matthews Band, Jeff Coffin, and a play-along CD that includes Coffin, Chris Walters, and GRAMMY winners Victor Wooten and Roy “Futureman” Wooten. Chapman wrote a column titled "Sound Thinking" for the Utah Daily Herald newspaper, about arts education, covered topics such as helping young students decide which instrument to play, and how parents can help their children discover their educational passions.

References

External links
 Caleb Chapman Music
 Crescent Super Band
 Jazz Education Network
 GAM Foundation

1973 births
Living people
People from Derry, New Hampshire
American music educators
American bandleaders
Caleb Chapman's Crescent Super Band members